The Logan Act (enacted ) is a United States federal law that criminalizes negotiation by unauthorized American citizens with foreign governments having a dispute with the United States. The intent behind the Act is to prevent unauthorized negotiations from undermining the government's position. The Act was passed following George Logan's unauthorized negotiations with France in 1798, and was signed into law by President John Adams on January 30, 1799. The Act was amended in 1994, changing the penalty for violation from "fined $5,000" to "fined under this title"; this appears to be the only amendment to the Act. Violation of the Logan Act is a felony.

Only two people have ever been indicted on charges of violating the Act, one in 1802 and the other in 1852. Neither was convicted.

History
In 1798, amid tensions between the U.S. and France, President Adams sent three envoys to France to negotiate. Negotiations were unsuccessful. Dr. George Logan of Pennsylvania, a state legislator and pacifist, in 1798 engaged in negotiations with France as a private citizen during the Quasi-War.

Kevin Kearney, writing in a case comment for the Emory Law Journal, described Dr. Logan's activities in France:

Despite the apparent success of Logan's mission, his activities aroused the opposition of the Federalist Party in Congress, who were resentful of the praise showered on Logan by oppositional Democratic-Republican newspapers. Secretary of State Timothy Pickering, also of Pennsylvania, responded by suggesting that Congress "act to curb the temerity and impudence of individuals affecting to interfere in public affairs between France and the United States." The result was that Rep. Roger Griswold introduced the Logan Act. It was pushed through by the Federalist majority in Congress by votes of 58–36 in the House and 18–2 in the Senate. Logan himself could not be punished by the Logan law, since the Constitution does not allow ex post facto, or retroactive laws: that is, laws that punish a person for actions taken before the law was enacted, and that were not illegal at the time they were committed. Rather, the intent was to discourage future Logans from conducting foreign policy at cross purposes with the current administration.

Subsequently, Logan himself was appointed and then elected as a Democratic-Republican to the United States Senate from Pennsylvania, and served from July 13, 1801, to March 3, 1807. He was unsuccessful in getting the Logan Act repealed. Despite the Logan Act, he went to England in 1810 on a private diplomatic mission as an emissary of peace in the period before the outbreak of the War of 1812, but was not successful.

During the nineteenth century, the act lay dormant, partly because American foreign policy receded in importance as an issue. During the twentieth century, however, with the Supreme Court paying greater attention to cases involving the First and Fifth amendments to the Constitution, and with the possibility of American foreign policy being more influenced by private individuals becoming more of a prominent issue in politics, there have been more cases potentially involving the Logan Act. Still, the Logan Act has been rarely enforced, possibly because prosecutors have been concerned that speech between a private citizen and a foreign government may still qualify as free speech and be protected in that regard.

Text 

1 Stat. 613, January 30, 1799, codified at 18 U.S.C. § 953 (2004).

Constitutional authority for foreign relations 
Article II, Section 2, Clause 2 of the United States Constitution includes the 'Treaty Clause,' which empowers the President of the United States to propose and chiefly negotiate agreements, which must be confirmed by the Senate, between the United States and other countries, which become treaties between the United States and other countries after the advice and consent of a supermajority of the United States Senate.

In United States v. Curtiss-Wright Export Corp., 299 U.S. 304 (1936), Justice Sutherland, writing for the Court, observed,

Accusations of violations 

In general, the Act is intended to prevent unauthorized American citizens from interfering in disputes or controversies between the United States and foreign governments. Although attempts have been made to repeal the Act, it remains law and at least a potential sanction to be used against anyone who without authority interferes in the foreign relations of the United States.

The US government has threatened to use the Act to stop Americans from negotiating with foreign governments. For example, in February 1941 Under Secretary of State Sumner Welles told the press that former President Herbert Hoover might be a target for prosecution because of his negotiations with European nations over sending food relief.

19th century
Only two indictments have ever been handed up under the Logan Act, both in the 19th century. The first occurred in 1803 when a grand jury indicted Francis Flournoy, a Kentucky farmer, who had written an article in the Frankfort Guardian of Freedom under the pen name of "A Western American." In the article, Flournoy advocated for the creation of a new independent state, not part of the US, in North America that would ally with France. The United States Attorney for Kentucky, an Adams appointee and brother-in-law of Chief Justice John Marshall, went no further than procuring the indictment of Flournoy, and there was no further prosecution of the Kentucky farmer. The purchase of the Louisiana Territory later that year appeared to cause the separatism issue to become moot, and the case was abandoned.

In 1852, Jonas Phillips Levy became the second and, to date the last, person to be indicted under the Logan Act. Levy, an American merchant and sailor who was living in Mexico at the time, had acquired a grant to build a railway across the Isthmus of Tehuantepec, the narrowest point across Mexico. Secretary of State Daniel Webster had been pressuring Mexico to accept a treaty that would allow a different group of American businessmen to build the railway. Levy wrote a letter to Mexican President Mariano Arista urging him to reject Webster's proposed treaty, prompting Webster to seek an indictment against Levy for violating the Logan Act. Federal prosecutors were forced to dismiss the case after Arista refused to hand over the original copy of the letter, depriving them of the evidence they needed to convict Levy.

20th century

In 1975, Senators John Sparkman and George McGovern traveled to Cuba and met with officials there. In considering that case, the U.S. Department of State concluded:

21st century
In June 2007, Representative Steve King introduced legislation that would prohibit Speaker of the House Nancy Pelosi from drawing on federal funds to travel to foreign states which the U.S. deemed to sponsor terrorism. The amendment was not adopted.

In March 2015, 47 Republican senators released an open letter to the Iranian government regarding President Barack Obama's attempts to broker a nuclear arms agreement between Iran and six major powers (P5+1). The letter warns Iran of the limitations of President Obama's term in office and constitutional powers and notes that anything done without the advice and consent of the Senate could be undone by the next President. A petition on the White House's We The People website requesting that the Obama administration prosecute the 47 senators under the Logan Act accumulated signatures from over 320,200 people. 

In April 2018, former Secretary of State John Kerry met with the Iranian Foreign Minister in order to ensure the Iran nuclear deal framework remained more or less intact. Matthew Summers, a spokesman for Kerry, admitted that Kerry "urged Iran to keep its commitments under the Iran nuclear agreement". Stephen Vladeck, law professor at the University of Texas, did not agree that Kerry would be in violation of the act as his intent was to preserve the US policy then in place, rather than seeking to destroy it. Vladeck has also said of the Act: "It raises serious constitutional questions that I think would dissuade even the most zealous prosecutor from trying a case under the Logan Act.”

Former U.S. Attorney for the Southern District of New York (SDNY) Geoffrey Berman stated that he was pressured by the Justice Department to indict Kerry for violating the Logan Act. The SDNY office informed the Department of Justice that it would not prosecute. Berman stated the Justice Department then sent the case to the office of the United States Attorney for the District of Maryland, which also declined to prosecute Kerry.

Constitutionality 
There has been little judicial discussion of the constitutionality of the Logan Act. The U.S. District Court for the Southern District of New York in Waldron v. British Petroleum Co., 231 F. Supp. 72 (S.D.N.Y. 1964), mentioned in passing that the Act was likely unconstitutional due to the vagueness of the terms "defeat" and "measures," but did not rule on the question.

See also 

 Alien and Sedition Acts
 Espionage Act

References 
 Inline citations

General references
 18 U.S. Code § 953 Private correspondence with foreign governments, (Cornell Law School)
 299 U.S. 304 United States v. Curtiss-Wright Export Corp, (Cornell Law School)

Further reading

External links 
 Report on Conducting Foreign Relations Without Authority: The Logan Act, February 1, 2006
 "Charlie Wilson's War: 2007". anyclip.com

1799 in American law
United States foreign relations legislation
Quasi-War
1799 in international relations